The Sipag Pinoy is a publication of the Department of Labor and Employment (DOLE) of the national government of the Philippines. Its office is located in Intramuros, Manila. It contains news and articles on industrial relations, officials and employees, labor laws and legislation, and other issues and trends in the labor sector in the Philippines.

References

External links
The Official Website of the Department of Labor and Employment

Magazines established in 1993
1993 establishments in the Philippines
Bi-monthly magazines
Legal magazines